The 1978 Vanderbilt Commodores football team represented Vanderbilt University in the 1978 NCAA Division I-A football season. The Commodores were led by head coach Fred Pancoast in his fourth season and finished the season with a record of two wins and nine losses (2–9 overall, 0–6 in the SEC).

Schedule

References

Vanderbilt
Vanderbilt Commodores football seasons
Vanderbilt Commodores football